Lynn Marie Freyse (March 24, 1937 – March 3, 2015) was an American film and television actress. She was known for playing Barbara Baxter in the final season of the American sitcom television series Hazel.

Life and career 
Borden was born in Detroit, Michigan, the daughter of Evelyn and Bill Freyse, a cartoonist, and raised in Tucson, Arizona. Borden attended the University of Arizona, where she performed in theatre and studied drama and psychology. Borden graduated with a bachelor's degree in 1958. In 1957 she had won the Miss Arizona pageant and been a runner-up in the Miss America Pageant.

Borden began her screen career in 1962 with an uncredited role as a party guest in the film Days of Wine and Roses. In 1965 she was cast as Barbara Baxter for the final season of Hazel. After the series ended in 1966 Borden appeared in other television programs, including The Fugitive, Get Smart, Fantasy Island and The Dick Van Dyke Show. She also starred and co-starred in films such as Bob & Carol & Ted & Alice, Frogs, Black Mama White Mama, Walking Tall, Dirty Mary Crazy Larry and Savannah Smiles. Borden retired in 2006, last appearing in the police procedural television series CSI: NY.

Personal life 
Borden married Chris Borden in 1958. They divorced in 1963. Borden married Roger Brunelle in 1982, the marriage lasting until her death in 2015.

Death 
Borden died in March 2015 after an extended illness in Encino, California, at the age of 77.

Filmography

Film

Television

References

External links 

Rotten Tomatoes profile

1937 births
2015 deaths
Actresses from Detroit
Actresses from Tucson, Arizona
University of Arizona alumni
American film actresses
American television actresses
20th-century American actresses
21st-century American actresses
21st-century American women